The 1320s BC is a decade which lasted from 1329 BC to 1320 BC.

Events
 1324 BC-Death of Pharaoh Tutankhamun of Egypt.
 1324 BC-Ay succeeds Tutankhamun
 1323 BC-18th Dynasty comes to an end.
 1319 BC-The reign of Ay comes to an end.